Destratification may refer to:

 Thermal destratification, mixing air to reduce stratified layers of heat that become trapped near the ceiling in buildings
 Lake stratification, mixing water to eliminate stratified layers of temperature, plant, or animal life